Bernd Wucherpfennig (born 22 December 1940) is a German diver. He competed at the 1968 Summer Olympics and the 1972 Summer Olympics.

References

1940 births
Living people
German male divers
Olympic divers of West Germany
Divers at the 1968 Summer Olympics
Divers at the 1972 Summer Olympics
Divers from Berlin
20th-century German people